is an anime studio in Arakawa, Tokyo, Japan. The company was formerly known as Television Corporation of Japan or TCJ before changing its name in 1969 to establish Eiken. It is a wholly owned subsidiary of Asatsu-DK.

Works

TCJ era

 Sennin Buraku (1963, Fuji TV)
 Tetsujin 28-go ("Gigantor" in North America) (1963, Fuji TV, planning by Dentsu)
 8 Man ("The 8th Man" in North America) (1963, TBS)
 Super Jetter (1965)
 Space Boy Soran (1965, TBS)
 Prince Planet (Yūsei Shōnen Papii) (1965)
 Yūsei Kamen (1966)
 Bōken Gabotenjima (1967)
 Skyers 5 (1967)
 The Cricket on the Hearth (1967)
 Sasuke (1968, TBS)
 Ninpū Kamui Gaiden (1969, Fuji TV, planning by Zuiyo)
 Sazae-san (1969–current, Fuji TV)
 Kamui Gaiden (1969, film)
 Dōbutsu-mura Monogatari (1970, NET)
 Bakuhatsu Gorō (1970, TBS)
 Norakuro (1970, Fuji TV)
 Shin Skyers 5 (1971, TBS)
 Onbu Obake (1972, Yomiuri TV)

Eiken era

 Bōken Korobokkuru (1973, Yomiuri TV)
 Jim Button (1974, MBS)
 Iruka to Shōnen (1975, TBS)
 Hokahoka Kazoku (1976–1982, Fuji TV)
 UFO Warrior Daiapolon (1976, TBS)
 UFO Senshi Daiapolon 2 (1976, Tokyo 12ch)
 Captain (1980, NTV; TV special)
 Captain (1981, film)
 Donbē Monogatari (1981, NTV)
 Captain (1983, TV series)
 Glass Mask (1984, NTV)
 Ginga Patrol PJ (1984, Fuji TV)
 Dotanba no Manā (1984–1987, Fuji TV)
 Musashi no Ken (1985–1986, TV Tokyo, "shonen" version)
 Musashi no Ken (1986, "seishun" version)
 Kotowaza House (1987–1994, Fuji TV)
 Hai Akko Desu (1988–1992, Asahi TV)
 Shīton Dōbutsuki (1989–1990, NTV)
 Kobo-chan Special: Filled with Autumn (1990)
 Kobo-chan Special: Filled with Dreams!! (1991)
 Micro Patrol (1991, joint release in France and Japan, OVA series released in Japan as well)
 Kobo-chan (1992–1994, Yomiuri TV)
 Cooking Papa (1992–1995, Asahi TV with Asatsu DK)
 Kobo-chan Special: Filled with Festivals! (1994)
 Oyako Club (1994-2013, Fuji TV)
 Ijiwaru Bā-san (second series, 1996–1997, Fuji TV)
 Kiko-chan Smile (1996–1997, TBS with Magic Bus)
 Otoko wa Tsurai yo: Torajirō Wasure na Kusa (1998, TBS with Magic Bus)
 Kobo-chan Special: The Promised Magic Day (1998)
 Suteki! Sakura Mama! (2000)
 Go! Go! Itsutsugo Land (2001-2002, with Magic Bus)
 Gokiburi-chan (2005)
 Play Ball (2005, with Magic Bus)
 Play Ball 2nd (2006, with Magic Bus)
 Tetsujin 28-go Gao! (2013-2016, Fuji TV)
 Bonobono (2016-current, Fuji TV)

Notes

References

External links
 Official Eiken website 
 
 
 

 
1969 establishments in Japan
Entertainment companies established in 1969
Japanese animation studios
Film production companies of Japan